Michael McManus (born April 15, 1962) is a Canadian actor who played the ex-assassin Kai in the science fiction series Lexx.

Early life
Michael McManus was born on April 15, 1962, in London, Ontario, Canada.

Career
He has appeared in various television and film roles including  Forever Knight, A Taste of Shakespeare, and the 1994 film Paint Cans, opposite Neve Campbell.

Filmography

Award nominations

References

External links
 
 Fan site

1962 births
Canadian male stage actors
Canadian male television actors
Canadian male film actors
Living people
Male actors from London, Ontario
University of Alberta alumni